Severe Tropical Cyclone Clare was a moderately strong cyclone that struck Western Australia in January 2006. The storm formed as an area of low pressure in the Arafura Sea, and moved westward. After receiving the name Clare on 7 January, the system ultimately peaked at Category 3 intensity on the Australian tropical cyclone scale. It moved ashore on the coast of Pilbara and proceeded inland, dissipating on 10 January. Following its usage, the name Clare was retired by the Bureau of Meteorology, and will never be used again for a tropical cyclone in the area.

Meteorological history

On 4 January 2006, a weak area of low pressure was situated in the Arafura Sea. It moved westward, and by 6 January, it was located in the Timor Sea. That same day, both the United States Joint Typhoon Warning Center (JTWC) and the Australian Bureau of Meteorology (BoM) identified the system as a tropical disturbance. On 7 January, the low began to show signs of strengthening. Continuing to organise, the BoM designated it as Tropical Cyclone Clare shortly thereafter. The JTWC classified the cyclone, locally designated 05S, as a tropical storm at 1800 UTC.

By early on 8 January, the storm had begun to steadily gain power. Tracking southwestward, the storm continued to mature. On 9 January, the JTWC estimated the storm to have peaked in intensity with maximum sustained 1-minute winds of 110 km/h (70 mph) and a minimum barometric pressure of 980 millibars. However, the BoM reported the storm to have been somewhat more intense, with sustained 10-minute winds of 140 km/h (85 mph) and a barometric pressure of 964 millibars. This made Clare a Category 3 on the Australian tropical cyclone scale.

Clare maintained roughly the same intensity as its track became more southerly. At 1600 UTC on 9 January the storm made landfall at Pilbara to the west of Dampier. Heading ashore, the storm began to quickly deteriorate, and both the JTWC and the BoM declared it dissipated on 10 January as it continued southward. Throughout the storm's course, the JTWC's intensity estimates were below that of the BoM. Also, it is reported that the cyclone's presentation on satellite was not representative of its actual intensity.

Preparations and impact

In advance of the storm's landfall, officials issued a "red alert" for several locations. Offshore, oil rigs were shut down and ports were closed. At least 2,000 residents were evacuated from their homes in potentially susceptible areas of the Karratha region. In areas between Broome and Port Hedland, people were urged to tidy debris and organise disaster supplies to prepare for the storm.

Heavy precipitation—often exceeding —was recorded along the central Pilbara coast. Since storm surge from the cyclone peaked during low tide, it was not severe and caused no known damage.

Clare produced extensive flooding that forced the closure of numerous roads, including part of the North West Coastal Highway. It also triggered torrential rains and flooding in southern areas of the country, including Gascoyne and the South-West Land Division. There,  of rain fell in 24 hours. Additionally, the Greenough River surpassed its banks; a sandbagging effort prevented the resultant floods from inundating the town of Walkaway. The storm cut off power and left tens of thousands of residents without telephone service. Property damage was generally minor, and no casualties or significant injuries from the storm were reported. The name Clare was retired following its usage in 2006.

See also

2005–06 Australian region cyclone season

References

External links
 Australian Bureau of Meteorology (TCWC's Perth, Darwin & Brisbane) .
 Joint Typhoon Warning Center (JTWC) .

Emma
Category 3 Australian region cyclones
2006 in Australia
Tropical cyclones in Western Australia
Clare
2000s in Western Australia